Marko Mandić (born 11 March 1999) is a Serbian footballer who plays for Bačka.

Club career

Vojvodina
On 17 May 2018 Mandić made his debut for Vojvodina, replacing Lazar Zličić in 6–1 away win against Čukarički. In July 2018, Mandić signed a four-year-deal with the club.

Bačka
On 5 July 2021, he joined Bačka.

Career statistics

Club

References

External links
 
 
 

1999 births
Living people
Association football defenders
Serbian footballers
FK Vojvodina players
OFK Bečej 1918 players
FK Kabel players
OFK Bačka players
Serbian SuperLiga players
Serbian First League players